USS Washington (BB-47), a , was the second ship of the United States Navy named in honor of the 42nd state. Her keel was laid down on 30 June 1919, at Camden, New Jersey, by the New York Shipbuilding Corporation. She was launched on 1 September 1921, sponsored by Miss Jean Summers, the daughter of Congressman John W. Summers of Washington.

On 8 February 1922, two days after the signing of the Washington Naval Treaty for the Limitation of Naval Armaments, all construction work ceased on the 75.9%-completed superdreadnought.

Design 

In 1916, design work was completed on the next class of battleships to be built for the United States Navy beginning in 1917. These ships were nearly direct copies of the preceding , with the exception of the main battery, which increased from twelve  guns to eight  guns. The Colorado class proved to be the last class of battleships completed of the standard type.

The ship was powered by four General Electric turbo-electric drives with steam provided by eight oil-fired Babcock & Wilcox boilers. Her crew numbered 64 officers and 1,241 enlisted men.

She was armed with a main battery of eight 16 in /45 caliber Mark 1 guns in four twin-gun turrets on the centerline, two forward and two aft in superfiring pairs. The secondary battery consisted of sixteen /51 caliber guns, mounted individually in casemates clustered in the superstructure amidships. She carried an anti-aircraft battery of eight /50 caliber guns in individual high-angle mounts. As was customary for capital ships of the period, she had a  torpedo tube mounted in her hull below the waterline on each broadside.

History 

With fiscal year 1917 appropriations, bids on the four Colorados were opened on 18 October 1916; though Marylands keel was laid on 24 April 1917. The other three battleships, including Washington, were not laid down until 1919–1920. With the cancellation of the first , the Colorados were the last U.S. battleships to enter service for nearly two decades. Washington was laid down on 30 June 1919.

On 8 February 1922, two days after the signing of the Washington Naval Treaty for the Limitation of all Naval Armaments, all construction work was stopped on the 75.9-percent-completed superdreadnought. By that time, she had her underwater armored protection in place.

The ship was towed out in November 1924, to be used as a gunnery target. On the first day of testing, the ship was hit by two  torpedoes and three  near-miss bombs causing minor damage and a list of three degrees. She then had 400 pounds of TNT detonated on board, but remained afloat. The ship was finally sunk by  Texas and New York with fourteen more 14-inch shells. After the test, it was decided that the existing deck armor on battleships was inadequate, and that future battleships should be fitted with triple bottoms, which was underwater armor with three layers.

Footnotes

Notes

Citations

References

External links 

 Washington (BB-47), construction cancelled 1922 
 MaritimeQuest USS Washington BB-47 Photo Gallery
 
 
 DANFS photographs of USS Washington (BB-47)

Colorado-class battleships
Ships built by New York Shipbuilding Corporation
1921 ships
Cancelled ships of the United States Navy
Maritime incidents in 1924
Ships sunk as targets
Shipwrecks in the Atlantic Ocean